General elections were held in Mauritius on 11 June 1982. 360 candidates representing 22 parties contested the election, the result of which was a landslide victory for the Mauritian Militant Movement–Mauritian Socialist Party alliance, which won all 60 of the directly elected mainland seats.

The voting system involved twenty constituencies on Mauritius, which each elected three members. Two seats were elected by residents of Rodrigues, and up to eight seats were filled by the "best losers", although following this election, only four "best loser" seats were awarded. Voter turnout was 87.3%.

Seewoosagur Ramgoolam received funding from the CIA during the election.

Results
Of the 60 seats won by the MMM–MSP alliance, 42 were taken by the MMM and 18 by the MSP.

References

Elections in Mauritius
1982 in Mauritius
Mauritius
Election and referendum articles with incomplete results
June 1982 events in Africa